"Escápate Conmigo" is a song by Puerto Rican rapper Wisin from his fourth studio album, Victory (2017). Featuring fellow Puerto Rican singer and rapper Ozuna, the track was released by Sony Music Latin on March 31, 2017. It was written by Ozuna, Marco Ramírez, Víctor Torres, Christian Linares-Carrasquillo, and Wisin, who also produced the song. The song peaked at number three on the US Billboard Hot Latin Songs chart. A remix featuring Bad Bunny, Arcangel & De La Ghetto, Noriel, and Almighty was released on July 7, 2017.

Background

In an interview with El Universal, talking about the differences between the single and his previous collaborations, Wisin said: "I always try to do different and bold things and I think that's the key because when you do, two things happen: either you cannot give the audience what they want to hear or you gave something so refreshing that they could connect more with you and your music." The song was previously leaked on social media, which forced him to officially release the song a week early. When asked about his view, Wisin said: "That's the deal. We artists have to understand that we are living in a world that has evolved a lot technologically. Maybe physical discs are no longer sold, but there are different platforms that help the whole planet to listen to our music. Sometimes we win, sometimes we lose, pirate themes and that is part of the fury, the affection and the desire that millions of fans have to listen to your work; We only have to keep making good music and intend to bring joy to the people, that is the most important thing."

Chart performance
The song moved from 48 to 15 on Billboards Hot Latin Songs chart on April 22, 2017, following the release of its music video. It gained 1.4 million streams in the tracking week ending April 6, 2017. It also peaked at 5 on the Latin Rhythm Airplay chart, making it Wisin's best entrance as lead artist since 2014. It is also Ozuna's second-best chart peak on the Hot Latin Songs chart.

As of August 2019, the music video for the song has received over 1.2 billion views on YouTube.

Live performances
On April 27, 2017, Wisin and Ozuna performed the song at the 2017 Billboard Latin Music Awards, which was held at the University of Miami Watsco Center.

Critical reception
Andreína Longoria of El Sol de Tijuana regarded the song as an "explosive combination".

Charts

Weekly charts

Year-end charts

Decade-end charts

Certifications

See also
List of Billboard number-one Latin songs of 2017

References

2017 singles
2017 songs
Wisin songs
Songs written by Wisin
Sony Music Latin singles
Ozuna (singer) songs
Bad Bunny songs
Noriel songs
Songs written by Ozuna (singer)
Music videos directed by Jessy Terrero